St. Louis Community College–Meramec (also known as STLCC-Meramec or Meramec) campus is located in the suburb of Kirkwood, Missouri.  Meramec is the largest community college in Missouri with over 12,000 undergraduate and transfer students. Along with the  main campus in Kirkwood, Meramec operates one satellite campus in South St. Louis County - Meramec's South County Education and University Center.  The college is named after the Meramec River that meanders through central Missouri before emptying into the Mississippi River at the border between St. Louis and Jefferson Counties.

History
St. Joseph College opened in 1889 on the site of the present day STLCC-Meramec campus The school was a small private Catholic college from 1889 until the early 1960s. When the college closed the land was redeveloped into the modern STLCC campus.

Notable programs
Meramec has many programs of study and offers a wide variety of associate degrees, some of the most popular being Business, Accounting, Music, Finance, Supply Chain Management, and Education. Meramec also has an extensive Horticulture program; the gardens and greenhouses can be seen on the southwestern part of campus from Big Bend Road. The student newspaper, the Montage, has won the MCMA-Missouri College Media Association's best two-year college newspaper in Missouri.

Meramec athletics
STLCC operates as a single entity in athletic competition; Meramec students are permitted to participate if eligible.

Meramec serves as the "home field" for Men's Baseball, Women's Soccer, Women's Softball and Women's Volleyball.

Prior to STLCC consolidating all athletic programs under one banner, STLCC-Meramec participated under the name Magic.

Notable former athletes
 Zak Cummings, 2x NJCAA Wrestling National Qualifier; professional mixed martial artist for the UFC's Welterweight Division
 David Freese (2002–03), Major League Baseball player for the Los Angeles Dodgers, 2011 NLCS and 2011 World Series MVP.
 Jason High, 2x National Wrestling Championship qualifier; current mixed martial artist formerly for the Ultimate Fighting Championship
 Michael Johnson (fighter), wrestler; The Ultimate Fighter 12 finalist, MMA fighter, currently competing in the Lightweight division of the UFC

See also
St. Louis Community College

References

External links
St. Louis Community College STLCC-Meramec
Meramec Montage Newspaper

Meramec
Two-year colleges in the United States
Universities and colleges in St. Louis County, Missouri
Educational institutions established in 1972
1972 establishments in Missouri